Bennie Adams (born April 8, 1967) is an American professional basketball referee in the National Basketball Association.

In a regular season game between the San Antonio Spurs and the Los Angeles Lakers on April 12, 2011, Adams called a technical foul on Lakers guard Kobe Bryant. In frustration of the call, Bryant called Adams a derogatory gay term. On the following day, the NBA fined Bryant $100,000. The Lakers and Bryant later apologized for the use of the word.

References

1967 births
Living people
National Basketball Association referees
African-American sports officials
Sportspeople from New Orleans
Southern University alumni
Basketball people from Louisiana
21st-century African-American people
20th-century African-American sportspeople